Anton Sloboda (born 10 July 1987) is a Slovak footballer who plays as a midfielder for Fortuna liga club ViOn Zlaté Moravce.

Club career
He was signed by Spartak Trnava in July 2016.

Honours 
Spartak Trnava
 Fortuna Liga: 2017–18
 Slovnaft Cup: 2018–19

References

External links
 at mfkruzomberok.sk 

1987 births
Living people
Sportspeople from Považská Bystrica
Slovak footballers
Slovak expatriate footballers
Association football midfielders
MFK Ružomberok players
FK Viktoria Žižkov players
Podbeskidzie Bielsko-Biała players
FC Spartak Trnava players
FC ViOn Zlaté Moravce players
Slovak Super Liga players
Czech First League players
Czech National Football League players
Ekstraklasa players
Expatriate footballers in the Czech Republic
Expatriate footballers in Poland
Slovak expatriate sportspeople in the Czech Republic
Slovak expatriate sportspeople in Poland